Both Sides of the Sky is a compilation album by Jimi Hendrix, released by Legacy Recordings and Experience Hendrix on March 9, 2018. The 13-track album, including ten previously unreleased recordings, were recorded with either the Jimi Hendrix Experience or the Band of Gypsys lineups, and features guest appearances from Stephen Stills, Johnny Winter and Lonnie Youngblood.

The album is the third (and final) release in a trilogy of posthumously released "archival recordings" compilation albums highlighted as intended for a follow-up to Electric Ladyland (1968), starting with Valleys of Neptune (2010) and continuing with People, Hell and Angels (2013).

Critical reception
In a review for AllMusic, Sean Westergaard gave the album a rating of 3.5 stars out of five. He notes that some of the material had been previously released on bootlegs, "but the truly surprising thing about this collection is the amount of material even hardcore Hendrix collectors may not have heard yet". Westergaard identifies the instrumental "Cherokee Mist", for which Hendrix plays an electric sitar, as an album highlight and concludes with "While a bit uneven in spots, Both Sides of the Sky is well worth it for an avid Hendrix fan."

Track listing
All songs recorded in New York City at the Record Plant Studios, except for "Sweet Angel" recorded at Olympic Studios in London. All tracks were written by Jimi Hendrix, except where noted.

Personnel
Jimi Hendrix – guitar on all tracks, except 11; vocals on all tracks, except 5, 7, 9, 11, 13; bass guitar on track 10, 11; vibraphone track 10; sitar track 13
Johnny Winter – guitar on track 8
Billy Cox – bass guitar tracks 1, 2, 4–7, 12
Buddy Miles – drums tracks 1, 2, 4–7, 11, 12
Mitch Mitchell – drums tracks 3, 8–10, 13
Noel Redding – bass guitar track 3
Stephen Stills – vocals and organ on tracks 5, 11
Lonnie Youngblood – vocals and saxophone on track 9

Charts

References

Jimi Hendrix compilation albums
2018 compilation albums
Albums produced by Eddie Kramer
Legacy Recordings compilation albums
Compilation albums published posthumously